The Birth of New China is a 1989 Chinese drama film directed by Li Qiankuan. The film was selected as the Chinese entry for the Best Foreign Language Film at the 62nd Academy Awards, but was not accepted as a nominee.

Cast
 Fazeng Guo
 Gu Yue
 Huang Kai
 Liu Huaizheng
 Lü Qi
 Niu Xingli
 Sun Feihu
 Chen Jiming

See also
 List of submissions to the 62nd Academy Awards for Best Foreign Language Film
 List of Chinese submissions for the Academy Award for Best Foreign Language Film

References

External links
 

1989 films
1989 crime drama films
Chinese drama films
1980s Mandarin-language films